The 2010 All-Ireland Senior Ladies' Football Championship Final featured   and . This was Dublin's fourth final and Tyrone's first. On the three previous occasions Dublin had reached the final in 2003, 2004 and 2009, they had finished as runners-up. In 2010 they would win  their first title. On their way to the final, Tyrone had knocked out  in the quarter-final, interrupting their monopoly of the All-Ireland for one year.  However Tyrone proved to be no match for Dublin in the final. At half-time Dublin led by 2–8 to 0–5. With twenty minutes remaining, Dublin led by 16 points and that margin would separate the two teams at the finish. Sinéad Aherne scored 2–7 to claim the Player of the Match award.

Route to the Final

Match info

Teams

Notes

References

 
All-Ireland Senior Ladies' Football Championship Finals
Gaelic football
Dublin county ladies' football team matches
Tyrone county ladies' football team matches
All-Ireland